Al Bandari Mobarak Abdullah (born 9 December 2001) is a Saudi Arabian footballer who plays as a forward for Saudi Arabian club Al Yamamah and the Saudi Arabia national team.

Club career
Mobarak helped Al Yamamah finish in third place in the 2021–22 Saudi Women's Football League.

International career
Mobarak was part of the Saudi Arabia women's national team's first international game, in a friendly tournament in the Maldives in February 2022; she scored her team's first goal, in a 2–0 win over Seychelles on 20 February. On 24 February, Mobarak scored her first international brace, scoring both of Saudi Arabia's goals in a 2–0 win against the Maldives.

Career statistics

International

Scores and results list Saudi Arabia's goal tally first, score column indicates score after each Mobarak goal.

See also
 List of top international women's football goal scorers by country
 List of Saudi Arabia women's international footballers

References

External links
 
 

2001 births
Living people
Place of birth missing (living people)
Saudi Arabian women's footballers
Women's association football forwards
Saudi Women's Premier League players
Saudi Arabia women's international footballers